El rey de los gitanos, was a 1933 American Spanish language comedy-drama film directed by Frank Strayer, which stars José Mojica, Rosita Moreno, and Julio Villarreal. The screenplay was written by Paul Perez, Llewellyn Hughes, and José López Rubio. It was produced and distributed by Fox Films, and premiered in Barcelona, Spain on May 23, 1933. Its U.S. premiere occurred three days later in Los Angeles on May 26.

Cast list
 José Mojica as Karol
 Rosita Moreno as Princess María Luisa
 Julio Villarreal as El Gran Duque Alejandro
 Romualdo Tirado as Remetz
 Ada Lozano as Renée
 Antonio Vidal as Primer ministro
Martín Garralaga as Gregor
Paco Moreno as Cabo

References

External links
 
 
 

1933 comedy-drama films
American comedy-drama films
Spanish-language American films
Films directed by Frank R. Strayer
Films about Romani people
Fox Film films
American black-and-white films
1933 films
1930s Spanish-language films
1930s American films